Lucy Diamond is an English author of female lead fiction, whose real name is Sue Mongredien.

Biography
She grew up in Nottingham, and studied English Literature at Leeds University.

Mongredien now lives in Bath.

Her first book, Any Way You Want Me, was published by Pan Macmillan in 2007. She has sold 907,678 print books in the UK for £4.2m, according to Nielsen BookScan.

In 2011, her novel Sweet Temptations was shortlisted for the Melissa Nathan Award for Comedy Romance.

In 2021, after 14 years with Pan MacMillan, Mongredien moved to Quercus.

Mongredien has also authored several children's books, including books in The Sleepover Club series, the Rainbow Magic series, the Oliver Moon series, and the Captain Cat series.

Bibliography 
 On a Beautiful Day
 The Promise
 An Almost Perfect Holiday
 Any Way You Want Me
 Over You
 Hens Reunited
 Sweet Temptation
 The Beach Café
 Summer with My Sister
 Me and Mr Jones
 One Night in Italy
 Christmas at the Beach Café (short story)
 Christmas Gifts at the Beach Café (short story)
 The Year of Taking Chances
  Summer At Shell Cottage
 A Baby at the Beach Café (short story)
 The Secrets of Happiness
 The House of New Beginnings
 Something to Tell You

References

English women novelists
Living people
1970 births
People associated with the University of Leeds